Robert Turcescu (born May 3, 1975) is a Romanian journalist, politician, TV presenter, media critic, radio personality, and singer-songwriter.

Early life and education
Born in Piteşti, he attended the Ion Brătianu High School there, followed by the Superior School of Journalism in Bucharest, which he finished in 1997. The following year, he graduated from the University of Bucharest's Faculty of Journalism and Communication Sciences.

Journalism
Turcescu began his career in 1993 as a writer for the magazine Pop Rock & Show and for the newspaper Curierul naţional. The following year, the news agency A-M. Press hired him as a reporter. From 1996 to 1998, he worked as a reporter for Radio Total, advancing to editor-in-chief that year. In 2000, he became editor-in-chief at Europa FM, and since that year he has hosted the show România în direct there. In 2001 he was a presenter for TVR's Telematinal and an editor at Evenimentul Zilei. Since 2003 he has written for the magazine Dilema. He hosted 100% on Realitatea TV from that year until 2010. He has continued hosting his show at the B1 TV starting with the end of September 2010.
He was also editor-in-chief of Cotidianul in 2004–05.

He is the host of 100%, a political one-to-one talk-show that aired on Realitatea TV and B1 TV. He participated in the Eurovision Song Contest 2013 with the song Un refren.

Awards
He has received a number of awards. For instance, in 2002 the National Audiovisual Council named România în direct the best radio talk show, while in 2004, the Association of Television Professionals granted 100% an award for best television talk show.

Undercover agent
Turcescu is best known for confessing in 2014 to being an undercover agent of a military secret service in Romania while posing as a freelance journalist for several years, thus raising concerns about the penetration of the secret security services in the media sector of Romania.

Politics
In the Romanian local elections of 2016, Turcescu ran for mayor of Bucharest, supported by the People's Movement Party (PMP); he subsequently placed 4th, with 6.46% of the votes. Afterwards, he became PMP's vice-president and ad interim president of the Bucharest branch. Turcescu eventually won a seat in the Chamber of Deputies on PMP's party list in the wake of the 2016 legislative elections.

Notes

Living people
1975 births
People from Pitești
University of Bucharest alumni
Romanian television presenters